The Deportivo Táchira Futbol Club is a professional football club of the city of San Cristóbal, Venezuela. It was founded on January 11, 1974 by Gaetano Greco, and was originally called the San Cristobal Football Club. It is Venezuela's most popular football club.

The club plays its home matches at the Polideportivo de Pueblo Nuevo, which has a capacity of 42,500. Since 1975, it participates in the Venezuelan Primera División, making it the only Venezuelan team that has never fallen or participated in the lower category. Currently it holds the first position of the historical classification of the Venezuelan Primera División with 2229 points.

At the international level, it is the Venezuelan club with the most appearances in the Copa Libertadores. Its best international participation was its advance to the quarter-finals unbeaten in the Copa Libertadores 2004. It is the only Venezuelan club that has advanced past the first phase of the Copa Libertadores.

Deportivo Tachira has a subsidiary named Deportivo Táchira team "B", which participates in the Venezuelan Segunda División. It also has a Futsal team called Deportivo Tachira Fútsal Club, which plays in the Venezuelan Futsal League and the Superior Futsal Tournament.

Its fiercest rival is the Caracas FC, with whom it disputes the "Modern Derby" (Clásico Moderno) of Venezuelan football. It also plays the so-called "Andean Derby" (Clásico Andino) against Estudiantes de Mérida.

History
In 1970, Italian-born Gaetano Greco founded an amateur club called Juventus in San Cristóbal, named after the Juventus FC. In 1974, Greco noticed that there were no professional football clubs in Táchira, so he decided to found a club in Táchira based on the amateur Juventus club. He and twelve other people founded the club on January 11 of that year, which they named San Cristóbal Fútbol Club. Most of the club's players came from the Juventus club. Initially, the club's colors were blue and white, similar to the Italy national football team kits.

In January 1975, the club changed its colors to yellow and black, because those colors better represented the Táchira state and were the preferred colors of the Uruguayan manager José "Pocho" Gil, as they were the colors of the Uruguayan team Peñarol.

In the 2016 season, Deportivo Táchira drew an average home league attendance of 5,595 in the Apertura and 4,033 in the Clausura, the highest in the domestic league.

Naming history

Stadium

The club's home stadium is Polideportivo de Pueblo Nuevo, located in San Cristóbal. It has a maximum capacity of 42,500 people.

Supporters
The team's supporters are known as aurinegros ("gold-and-blacks"). The supporters are mainly divided into three groups; La Torcida Aurinegra , La Avalancha Sur, and Comando Sur.

Several of the team's supporters have committed violent acts in the past towards the supporters of opposing teams. One of the most tragic events took place on December 17, 2000, when the club and Caracas drew 2–2, which gave the Copa República Bolivariana de Venezuela's title to Caracas, causing angry supporters of Deportivo Táchira to burn the Caracas team bus.

Derby
Games between Deportivo Táchira and Estudiantes de Mérida are known as the Clásico de Los Andes (meaning Andes' Derby). However, in recent years games between Deportivo Táchira and Caracas have been known as the modern derby, because of the successful performance of both teams. A former rival of Deportivo Táchira in the 1980s and early 1990s was Marítimo de Venezuela, a former team from Caracas.

Colors
Deportivo Táchira's shirt has black and yellow vertical stripes, with black shorts and socks.

Titles and International Appearances
Primera División Venezolana: 9
1979, 1981, 1984, 1986, 1999-2000, 2007–08, 2010–11, 2014–15, 2021

Copa Venezuela: 1
 1982

Copa Libertadores: 25 appearances

1980: First Round
1982: First Round
1983: First Round
1985: First Round
1987: First Round
1988: First Round
1989: Round of 16
1991: Round of 16

2000: Preliminary Round
2001: First Round
2004: Quarter-finals
2005: Second Round
2006: First Round
2007: First Round
2009: Second Round
2010: First Round
2011: Second Round
2012: Second Round
2015: Second Round
2016: Round of 16
2017: First Round
2018: First Round
2020: First Round
2021: Second Round
2022: Second Round

Copa Sudamericana: 3 appearances
2002: Preliminary Round
2012: Preliminary Round
2021: Round of 16
2022: Quarter-finals

Copa CONMEBOL: 3 appearances
1993: First Round
1996: First Round
1997: First Round

Deportivo Táchira is the Venezuelan club with the most Copa Libertadores appearances and the most runner-up finishes in the Venezuelan league. It has won nine national championships.
The club's best Copa Libertadores participation was in 2004, when the club became the second team to qualify for the quarter-finals of the competition without losing a match, having played against strong teams such as River Plate (Argentina), Libertad (Paraguay), Deportes Tolima (Colombia), and Nacional (Uruguay), before facing São Paulo (Brazil) in the quarter-finals.

Current squad
As of 16 October 2022

Important players
 Tomás Rincón (2008) – First Venezuelan player to play in an important international soccer team such as Juventus FC in 2017. He currently for Torino FC in Italy.
 Cesar "El Maestrico" Gonzalez – Important player with a big important career in different teams around South America such as River Plate, Coritiba, San Luis and other teams of the First Venezuelan league. Currently, he plays in Deportivo La Guaira in Venezuela.
 Daniel Francovig – In the 1987 Copa Libertadores the Uruguayan goalkeeper beat Luis Islas from his own box, with a bounce that misled Independiente's goalkeeper. He scored the best remembered goal by a goalkeeper in the history of football.
 Carlos Maldonado – Uruguayan central midfielder, obtained a total number of 20 caps for the Venezuela national team, scoring four goals. All his goals came at the 1989 Copa América.

Head coaches
 Luis Miloc (1977–78)
 Esteban Beracochea (1978–83) (Campeón 79 y 81)
 Marcos Calderón (1983)
 Carlos Horacio Moreno (1984–89) (Campeón 84 y 86)
 Richard Páez (1991)
 Walter Roque (1999–01) (Campeón 99-00)
 César Farías (2003–05)
 Manuel Plasencia (2005–07)
 Carlos Maldonado (2007–2010) (Campeón 07-08)
 Jorge Luis Pinto (2010–2011) (Campeón 10-11)
 Jesús Vera (2011)
 Jaime de la Pava (2012)
 Manuel Contreras (2012)
 Daniel Farías (2013–2015) (Campeón 14-15)
 Carlos Maldonado (2015–2016)
 Santiago Escobar (2016-2017)
 Francesco Stifano (2017-2018)
 Álex Pallares (2018)
 Giovanni Pérez (2019)
 Juan Domingo Tolisano (2019-2021) (Campeón 2021)
 Álex Pallares (2022-)

Notes 
Much of the content of this article comes from the equivalent Spanish-language Wikipedia article (retrieved January 15, 2004).

References

External links
Deportivo Táchira's official website

Football clubs in Venezuela
Association football clubs established in 1974
Tachira
1974 establishments in Venezuela